Laminin subunit gamma-2 is a protein that in humans is encoded by the LAMC2 gene.

Laminins, a family of extracellular matrix glycoproteins, are the major noncollagenous constituent of basement membranes.  They have been implicated in a wide variety of biological processes including cell adhesion, differentiation, migration, signaling, neurite outgrowth and metastasis.  Laminins are composed of 3 non identical chains: laminin alpha, beta and gamma (formerly A, B1, and B2, respectively) and they form a cruciform structure consisting of 3 short arms, each formed by a different chain, and a long arm composed of all 3 chains.  Each laminin chain is a multidomain protein encoded by a distinct gene.

Several isoforms of each chain have been described.  Different alpha, beta and gamma chain isomers combine to give rise to different heterotrimeric laminin isoforms which are designated by Arabic numerals in the order of their discovery, i.e. alpha1beta1gamma1 heterotrimer is laminin 1.  The biological functions of the different chains and trimer molecules are largely unknown, but some of the chains have been shown to differ with respect to their tissue distribution, presumably reflecting diverse functions in vivo. This gene encodes the gamma chain isoform laminin, gamma 2.  The gamma 2 chain, formerly thought to be a truncated version of beta chain (B2t), is highly homologous to the gamma 1 chain; however, it lacks domain VI, and domains V, IV and III are shorter.  It is expressed in several fetal tissues but differently from gamma 1, and is specifically localized to epithelial cells in skin, lung and kidney.  The gamma 2 chain together with alpha 3 and beta 3 chains constitute laminin 5 (earlier known as kalinin), which is an integral part of the anchoring filaments that connect epithelial cells to the underlying basement membrane.  The epithelium-specific expression of the gamma 2 chain implied its role as an epithelium attachment molecule, and mutations in this gene have been associated with junctional epidermolysis bullosa, a skin disease.

References

Further reading

Laminins